IAE de Lille, also known as Institut d'Administration des Entreprises de Lille is the business school of the University of Lille. It is also a component of the "Réseau des IAE", bringing together 33 similar business schools around France.  Being one of the top French universities in management, school is highly internationalized and has an alumni network of 18,000 former students throughout the world.

IAE Lille is situated in old town of Lille.

IAE participates in Erasmus Programme and also maintains exchange agreements with several universities across Europe, Asia and America.

Admissions
Students are recruited after a bachelor's or master's degree from Public Universities, Grandes Ecoles, Grands Etablissements or equivalents.
Candidates need to show very good academic records, pass an entrance examination, and show working knowledge of the French language.

Ranking
The IAE Lille has been ranked #10 Business school in France by Le Nouvel Economiste.

History
The Institut d'Administration des Entreprises de Lille was established in 1956 by Gaston Berger. The vocation of the school is to provide skills in Management and Business Administration to executives and students from various backgrounds (in engineering, law, humanities...)  and to offer advanced expertise to high potential professionals.

Undergraduate, Masters & Doctorate
 MSc Management MSc (Audit, Accounting and Finance, Internal Audit and Control, International Commerce, Financing and Development of Organizations, General Business Management, Human Resources)
 BSc in Economics and Management (in English)
 MSc in Business Administration
 MSc in Executive International Management (in English)
 MSc in International Commerce
 MSc in Marketing
 MSc in Project Management
 MSc in Marketing Research
 Doctorate in Management Science - Strategic Management 
 Doctorate in Marketing

Campus
In 1996 main campus was moved to a remodeled 18th century building in the Old town of Lille.

Research
IAE de Lille participates in the management research studies. About a hundred of researches work for Center of national scientific research in 5 topics:
 Money, finance, banking
 Strategy and management of organizations
 Marketing and IT
 Economics and health management
 Productivity and efficiency measurement

External links
 Official Web Site

Lille
Educational institutions established in 1956
University of Lille Nord de France
1956 establishments in France